The Women's Handball DDR-Oberliga was the highest category in the championship for women's handball in East Germany. Founded in 1951, 41 editions took place before the competition was disestablished in 1991 following the reunification of Germany. SC Leipzig was the championship's most successful with fifteen championships between 1953 and 1991, followed by Fortschritt Weissenfels and Vorwärts Frankfurt with six, TSC Berlin with four and Empor Rostock with three. 

The leading teams in the DDR-Oberliga were successful in international competitions. SC Leipzig won two European Cups and one EHF Cup, TSC Berlin also won the European Cup and two Cup Winners' Cups and Vorwärts Frankfurt clinched two EHF Cups, while Empor Rostock and SC Magdeburg also played European finals. Leipzig would later become one of the leading teams of the Bundesliga, with six championships between 1998 and 2010.

List of champions

 1951 BSG KWU Weimar
 1952 SC Berlin Weissensee
 1953 Rotation Leipzig-Mitte
 1954 BSG Einheit Weimar
 1955 BSG Fortschritt Weissenfels
 1956 BSG Lokomotive Rangsdorf
 1957 BSG Lokomotive Leipzig
 1958 BSG Fortschritt Weissenfels
 1959 BSG Fortschritt Weissenfels
 1960 BSG Chemie Zietz
 1961 BSG Lokomotive Rangsdorf
 1962 BSG Fortschritt Weissenfels
 1963 BSG Fortschritt Weissenfels
 1964 BSG Fortschritt Weissenfels

 1965 SC Leipzig
 1966 SC Empor Rostock
 1967 SC Empor Rostock
 1968 SC Leipzig
 1969 SC Leipzig
 1970 SC Leipzig
 1971 SC Leipzig
 1972 SC Leipzig
 1973 SC Leipzig
 1974 TSC Berlin
 1975 SC Leipzig
 1976 SC Leipzig
 1977 TSC Berlin
 1978 SC Leipzig

 1979 TSC Berlin
 1980 TSC Berlin
 1981 SC Magdeburg
 1982 ASK Vorwärts Frankfurt
 1983 ASK Vorwärts Frankfurt
 1984 SC Leipzig
 1985 ASK Vorwärts Frankfurt
 1986 ASK Vorwärts Frankfurt
 1987 ASK Vorwärts Frankfurt
 1988 SC Leipzig
 1989 HC Empor Rostock
 1990 ASK Vorwärts Frankfurt
 1991 SC Leipzig

References

 

East
Handball competitions in East Germany
Sports leagues established in 1951
1951 establishments in East Germany
Recurring events disestablished in 1991
1991 disestablishments in Germany
 
Women's handball in Germany